The 1888 United States presidential election in Alabama was held on November 6, 1888, as part of the concurrent Presidential election in which all thirty-eight contemporary states participated. Alabama voters chose ten electors, or representatives to the Electoral College, who voted for President and Vice-President.

Alabama was won easily by the Democratic nominee, former President and Governor of New York Grover Cleveland, over the Republican nominee, former Indiana Senator Benjamin Harrison. Increasing intimidation of African Americans who attempted to vote meant that Cleveland increased his margin of 22% in 1884 to 34.51%. Increasingly blatant electoral fraud in the region against the Republican Party – associated at this state with the memories of Reconstruction – meant that Cleveland carried every Black Belt county, and lost only five counties in North Alabama that were unfavourable to his Bourbon Democrat policies and image.

Results

Results by county

See also
 Presidencies of Grover Cleveland
 Presidency of Benjamin Harrison
 United States presidential elections in Alabama

References

Alabama
1888
1888 Alabama elections